The JTBC Classic Presented by Barbasol, formerly the Kia Classic, is a women's professional golf tournament in Southern California on the LPGA Tour. It debuted in 2010 at the La Costa Resort and Spa in Carlsbad, then moved north for a year in 2011 to the Industry Hills Golf Club at Pacific Palms in the City of Industry in Los Angeles County. The tournament returned to La Costa in 2012 and moved to Aviara Golf Club, also in Carlsbad, for 2013.

In 2022, the title sponsor of the tournament changed to JTBC (Joongang Tongyang Broadcasting Company), a South Korean nationwide pay television network.  

The winner of the inaugural tournament was Hee Kyung Seo, a member of the LPGA of Korea Tour (KLPGA). She became the 19th non-LPGA member in LPGA Tour history to win an LPGA Tournament and the first to win as a sponsor exemption since Jin Joo Hong won the KOLON-Hana Bank Championship in South Korea in October 2006. With the win, Seo became immediately eligible for LPGA membership and was a rookie on the LPGA Tour in 2011.

In 2011, the event was decided by the final pairing on the final green. With both players tied at 15-under, Sandra Gal hit a wedge to within  of the hole and Jiyai Shin was  out.  Gal made hers for birdie to win her first LPGA event by a stroke.

Tournament names

 2010: Kia Classic Presented by J Golf
 2011–2021: Kia Classic
2022: JTBC Classic Presented by Barbasol

Winners

Tournament records

See also 

 La Costa Resort and Spa
 Industry Hills Golf Club

References

External links
JTBC Classic Presented by Barbasol official site
Coverage on the LPGA Tour's official site
Aviara Golf Club

LPGA Tour events
Golf in California
Carlsbad, California
Sports competitions in San Diego County, California
Kia Motors
Recurring sporting events established in 2010
2010 establishments in California